René Xavier Marie Alain Cuny (12 July 1908 – 16 May 1994) was a French actor of stage and screen. He was closely linked with the works of Paul Claudel and Antonin Artaud, and for his performances for the Théâtre national populaire and Odéon-Théâtre de France. 

His film work included collaborations with directors Marcel Carné, Louis Malle, Jean-Luc Godard, Federico Fellini, Michelangelo Antonioni, Francesco Rosi, and Luis Buñuel. He was nominated for the César Award for Best Supporting Actor for the 1988 film Camille Claudel, and won the Joseph Plateau Lifetime Achievement Award in 1992.

Early life
René Xavier Marie Alain Cuny was born in Saint-Malo, Brittany. He was brought up by an aunt and spent a large part of his childhood with her, in Boucé, and spent several years in an orphanage. He developed an early interest in painting and from the age of 15 he attended the École des Beaux-Arts in Paris. He met Picasso, Braque and members of the surrealist group. He then began working in the film industry as a costume, poster and set designer and was employed on films of Cavalcanti, Feyder and Renoir. After a meeting with the actor-manager Charles Dullin, Cuny was persuaded to study drama and he began acting on stage in the late 1930s.

Career 

In the theatre, Cuny became particularly linked with the works of Paul Claudel (who said of him after a performance of L'Annonce faite à Marie in 1944, "I have been waiting for you 20 years"). Another literary friend and hero was Antonin Artaud, "whose texts he read with supreme conviction at a time when Artaud was more or less an outcast, a situation reflected in Artaud's Van Gogh: The Man Suicided by Society, which Cuny interpreted in his voice's fabulous organ tones". Later Cuny worked with Jean Vilar at the Théâtre national populaire, and with Jean-Louis Barrault at the Odéon-Théâtre de France. His dramatic presence and measured diction made him well-suited to many classical roles.

His first major role in the cinema was as one of the devil's envoys in Marcel Carné's film Les Visiteurs du soir (1942). A few other romantic leading parts followed, but increasingly he appeared in supporting roles, especially in characterizations of intellectuals such as the tormented philosopher Steiner in La Dolce Vita (1960), directed by Federico Fellini. He worked frequently in Italian cinema and had close associations with Michelangelo Antonioni and Francesco Rosi as well as Fellini. One of his most admired film performances was in Rosi's Uomini contro (Many Wars Ago, 1970), as the rigidly authoritarian General Leone.

Among his French films were The Lovers (Les Amants, 1958), directed by Louis Malle, and Jean-Luc Godard's Détective (1985). He also appeared in the softcore porn film Emmanuelle (1974), a role which he said he took to show his contempt for the film business. In the same year, he played Sitting Bull in the absurdist western Ne touchez pas à la femme blanche! (Don't Touch the White Woman!, 1974). 

Towards the end of his career he returned to aspects of Claudel. He appeared in Camille Claudel (1988), a biographical film about the author's sister in which he played their father, Louis-Prosper Claudel. In 1991, he completed a long-planned film adaptation of a Claudel play The Annunciation of Marie (L'Annonce faite à Marie, 1991), a French-Canadian production in which he both directed and acted; it won him the Prix Georges-Sadoul. He also gave regular readings of Claudel's work at the Festival d'Avignon.

Personal life 
In 1962, he married Marie-Blanche Guidicelli. The couple divorced in 1969.

Death 
Cuny died in 1994 in Paris. He is buried in Civry-la-Forêt, west of Paris, where he had lived.

Partial filmography 

1940: Après Mein Kampf mes crimes (directed by Alexandre Ryder) - Marinus van der Lubbe
1941: Madame Sans-Gêne (directed by Roger Richebé) - Roustan
1941: Remorques (Stormy Waters) (directed by Jean Grémillon) - Un matelot du 'Mirva' (uncredited)
1942: Les Visiteurs du soir (directed by Marcel Carné) - Gilles - un ménestrel
1943: Le Baron fantôme (The Phantom Baron) (directed by Serge de Poligny) - Hervé
1946: Solita de Cordoue (directed by Willy Rozier) - Pierre Desluc
1951: Il Cristo proibito (The Forbidden Christ) (directed by Curzio Malaparte) - Antonio
1952: Camicie rosse (Red Shirts) (directed by Goffredo Alessandrini and Francesco Rosi) - Bueno
1952: Les Conquérants solitaires (directed by Claude Vermorel) - Pascal Giroud
1953: La signora senza camelie (The Lady Without Camelias) (directed by Michelangelo Antonioni) - Lodi
1953: Mina de Vanghel (directed by Maurice Barry and Maurice Clavel) - M. de Larçay
1953: Notre-Dame de Paris (The Hunchback of Notre Dame) (directed by Jean Delannoy) - Claude Frollo
1958: Les Amants (The Lovers) (directed by Louis Malle) - Henri Tournier
1960: La dolce vita (directed by Federico Fellini) - Steiner
1961: Scano Boa (directed by Renato Dall'Ara) - Cavarzvan
1962: La Croix des vivants (Cross of the Living) (directed by Ivan Govar) - Baron VonEggerth
1963: Peau de banane (Banana Peel)) (directed by Marcel Ophüls) - Hervé Bontemps
1963: La corruzione (Corruption) (directed by Mauro Bolognini) - Leonardo Mattioli
1965: Astataïon, ou Le Festin des morts (Mission of Fear) (directed by Fernand Dansereau) - Jean de Bréboeuf
1969: La Voie lactée (The Milky Way) (directed by Luis Buñuel) - L'homme à la cape / Man with cape
1969: Satyricon (directed by Federico Fellini) - Lica
1970: Uomini contro (Many Wars Ago) (directed by Francesco Rosi) - generale Leone
1971: La grande scrofa nera (directed by Filippo Ottoni) - Il Padre di Enrico
1971: Valparaiso, Valparaiso (directed by Filippo Ottoni)- Balthazar Lamarck-Caulaincourt
1972: L'udienza (directed by Marco Ferreri) - Padre gesuita
1972: Il maestro e Margherita (The Master and Margaret) (directed by Aleksandar Petrović) - Profesor Woland & Satana
1973: La rosa rossa (directed by Franco Giraldi)
1974: Touche pas à la femme blanche! (Don't Touch the White Woman!) (directed by Marco Ferreri) - Sitting Bull
1974: Emmanuelle (directed by Just Jaeckin) - Mario
1975: Ame no Amsterdam (directed by Koreyoshi Kurahara)
1975: Irene, Irene (directed by Peter Del Monte) - Guido Boeri
1976: Cadaveri eccellenti (Illustrious Corpses) (directed by Francesco Rosi) - Judge Rasto
1976: I prosseneti (directed by Brunello Rondi) - Il conte Davide
1977: Jacques Prévert (directed by Jean Desvilles) - Himself
1978: El recurso del método (The Recourse to the Method) (directed by Miguel Littín) - El Académico
1978: La Chanson de Roland (The Song of Roland) (directed by Frank Cassenti) - Turpin / Le moine
1979: Cristo si è fermato a Eboli (Christ Stopped at Eboli) (directed by Francesco Rosi) - Barone Nicola Rotunno
1979: Roberte (directed by Pierre Zucca) - pur esprit (voice)
1981: Les Jeux de la Comtesse Dolingen de Gratz (directed by Catherine Binet)
1982: Les Maîtres du temps (directed by René Laloux) - Xul (voice)
1983: Quartetto Basileus (Basileus Quartet) (directed by Fabio Carpi) -
1985: Détective (directed by Jean-Luc Godard) - Old Mafioso
1987: Cronaca di una morte annunciata (Chronicle of a Death Foretold) (directed by Francesco Rosi) - Widower
1987: Lucky Ravi (directed by Vincent Lombard) - Plantation Owner
1987: Das weite Land (The Distant Land) (directed by Luc Bondy) - Aigner - le père d'Otto
1988: Umi e (directed by Koreyoshi Kurahara)
1988: Camille Claudel (directed by Bruno Nuytten) - Louis-Prosper Claudel
1989: La Nuit de l'éclusier (directed by Franz Rickenbach) - Gutberg
1990: Les Chevaliers de la Table ronde (directed by Denis Llorca) - Merlin
1991: Uova di garofano (directed by Silvano Agosti) - Crimen
1991: L'Annonce faite à Marie (The Annunciation of Marie) (directed by Alain Cuny) - Anne Vercors
1992: Le Retour de Casanova (The Return of Casanova) (directed by Édouard Niermans) - Marquis

References

External links
 
 
 
 
 Alain Cuny, at Film Reference. Retrieved 22 January 2016.

1908 births
1994 deaths
French male film actors
French male stage actors
People from Saint-Malo
20th-century French male actors